Prince George's County (often shortened to PG County) is a county located in the U.S. state of Maryland bordering the eastern portion of Washington, D.C. As of the 2020 U.S. census, the population was 967,201, making it the second-most populous county in Maryland, behind Montgomery County. The 2020 census counted an increase of nearly 104,000 in the previous ten years. Its county seat is Upper Marlboro. It is the largest and the second most affluent African American-majority county in the United States, with five of its communities identified in a 2015 top ten list.

Prince George's County is included in the Washington metropolitan area. The county also hosts many federal governmental facilities, such as Joint Base Andrews and the United States Census Bureau headquarters.

Etymology
The official name of the county, as specified in the county's charter, is "Prince George's County, Maryland". The county is named after Prince George of Denmark (1653–1708), the consort of Anne, Queen of Great Britain, and the brother of King Christian V of Denmark and Norway. The county's demonym is Prince Georgian, and its motto is Semper Eadem, a phrase used by Queen Anne. Prince George's County is frequently referred to as "PG" or "PG County", an abbreviation which is the subject of debate, some residents viewing it as a pejorative and others holding neutral feelings toward the term or even preferring the abbreviation over the full name.

History

The Cretaceous Era brought dinosaurs to the area that left fossils now preserved in a  park in Laurel. The site, which among other finds has yielded fossilized teeth from Astrodon and Priconodon species, has been called the most prolific in the eastern United States.

In the mid to late Holocene era, the area was occupied by Paleo-Native Americans and then, later, Native Americans. When the first European settlers arrived, what is now Prince George's County was inhabited by people of the Piscataway Indian Nation. Three branches of the tribe are still living today, two of which are headquartered in Prince George's County.

17th century
Prince George's County was created by the English Council of Maryland in the Province of Maryland in April 1696 from portions of Charles and Calvert counties. The county was divided into six districts referred to as "Hundreds": Mattapany, Petuxant, Collington, Mount Calvert, Piscattoway and New Scotland.

18th century
A portion was detached in 1748 to form Frederick County. Because Frederick County was subsequently divided to form the present Allegany, Garrett, Montgomery, and Washington counties, all of these counties in addition were derived from what had up to 1748 been Prince George's County.

In 1791, portions of Prince George's County were ceded to form the new District of Columbia (along with portions of Montgomery County, Maryland and parts of Northern Virginia that were later returned to Virginia).

19th century
During the War of 1812, the British marched through the county by way of Bladensburg to burn the White House. On their return, they kidnapped a prominent doctor, William Beanes. Lawyer Francis Scott Key was asked to negotiate for his release, which resulted in his writing "The Star-Spangled Banner".

Prince George's County had the highest population of slaves within the state of Maryland. These enslaved Africans engaged in forced labor on tobacco farms and plantations throughout Prince George's County.

During the Civil War, hundreds of enslaved Black men in Prince George's County were given freedom in exchange for joining the Union Army and fighting in Colored units against Confederate Forces. When Abraham Lincoln ordered the end of slavery in America, he did not free the slaves in Maryland because he was concerned that slave owning Maryland would revolt and Washington D.C. would then be surrounded by Confederate forces. However John Pendleton Kennedy, a Maryland politician who became an abolitionist after watching a speech by Frederick Douglass, led a referendum campaign to end slavery in the state. In 1864, the citizens of Maryland voted to end slavery. However the state was so divided that the referendum won by only 1,000 votes. Lincoln then ordered the Union Army to enforce the ban in Maryland and all enslaved people in the state were freed.

After the Civil War, many African Americans attempted to become part of Maryland politics, but were met with violent repression after the fall of Reconstruction.

In April 1865, John Wilkes Booth made his escape through Prince George's County while en route to Virginia after killing President Abraham Lincoln.

20th century
The proportion of African Americans declined during the first half of the 20th century, but was renewed to over 50% in the early 1990s when the county again became majority African American. The first African American County Executive was Wayne K. Curry, elected in 1994.

On July 1, 1997, the Prince George's County section of the city of Takoma Park, which straddled the boundary between Prince George's and Montgomery counties, was transferred to Montgomery County. This was done after city residents voted in a referendum to be under the sole jurisdiction of Montgomery County, and subsequent approval by both counties and the Maryland General Assembly. This was the first change in Montgomery/Prince George's County line boundaries since 1968, when the City of Laurel was unified in Prince George's County; additional legislation was proposed in 1990 for a technical correction, though may not have achieved enactment.

21st century
The county's population nearly reached one million residents in the 2020 census. It is the largest and highest-income Black-majority county in the United States. Hispanic residents grew in number to 21% of the total population.

The county experienced a dramatic drop in crime, including record drops in violent crime, although in 2021 and 2022, violent crime increased by 30%. From 2020 to mid-2022 over 2,200 residents died of COVID-19, over 19,000 county residents were left with long-term post-COVID symptoms
and over 193,000 COVID infections had been recorded.

Geography

Prince George's County lies in the Atlantic coastal plain, and its landscape is characterized by gently rolling hills and valleys. Along its western border with Montgomery County, Adelphi, Calverton and West Laurel rise into the piedmont, exceeding  in elevation.

The Patuxent River forms the county's eastern border with Howard, Anne Arundel, Charles and Calvert counties.

Regions

Terrain, culture, and demographics differ significantly by location within the county. There are five key regions to Prince George's County: North County, Central County, the Rural Tier, the Inner Beltway, and South County. These regions are not formally defined, however, and the terms used to describe each area can vary greatly. In the broadest terms, the county is generally divided into North County and South County with U.S. Route 50 serving as the dividing line.

Southern Prince George's county is also considered to be a part of the Southern Maryland region.

North County
Northern Prince George's County includes Laurel, Beltsville, Adelphi, College Park and Greenbelt. This area of the county is anchored by the Capital Beltway and the Baltimore–Washington Parkway. Laurel is experiencing a population boom with the construction of the Inter-County Connector. The key employers in this region are the University of Maryland, Beltsville Agricultural Research Center, and NASA-Goddard Space Flight Center. Areas of geographic distinction include Greenbelt Park, a wooded reserve adjacent to the planned environmental community of Greenbelt, and University Park, a collection of historic homes adjacent to the University of Maryland. Riversdale Mansion, along with the historic homes of Berwyn Heights, Mt. Rainier and Hyattsville, along with Langley Park are also located in this area. Lake Artemesia and the surrounding park were constructed during the completion of the Washington Metro Green Line, and it incorporates a stocked fishing lake and serves as the trail-head for an extensive Anacostia Tributary Trails system that runs along the Anacostia River and its tributaries. The south and central tracts of the Patuxent Wildlife Research Center also lie in this part of the county; the north tract lies north of the Patuxent River in Anne Arundel County.

Central County
Central County, located on the eastern outskirts of the Capital Beltway, consists of Mitchellville, Woodmore, Greater Upper Marlboro, Springdale, Largo, and Bowie. According to the 2010 census, it has generally been the fastest growing region of the county. Mitchellville is named for a wealthy African American family, the Mitchells, who owned a large portion of land in this area of the county. Central Avenue, a major exit off the I-95 beltway, running east to west, is one of two main roads in this portion of the county. The other major roadway is Old Crain Highway, which runs north to south along the eastern portion of the county. The Newton White Mansion on the grounds is a popular site for weddings and political events. Bowie State University and Prince George's Community College are in the Central region.

Inner Beltway
The inner beltway communities of Capitol Heights, District Heights, Fairmont Heights, Forestville, Suitland, and Seat Pleasant border the neighboring District of Columbia's northeastern and southeastern quadrants. The area has easy access to Metro's blue line, commercial centers, Maryland Route 214, Interstate 95/Interstate 495 (Capital Beltway). Protected bike trails connect residents to the Bladensburg waterfront, Kenilworth parks, and downtown D.C. Fairmont Heights is the second oldest African-American-majority municipality in Prince George's County. The Fairmount Heights Historic District was added to the National Register of Historic Places in 2011.

Bowie is best known as a planned Levittown. William Levitt in the 1960s built traditional homes, as well as California contemporaries along U.S. Route 50, the key highway to the eastern shore and the state capital of Annapolis. Bowie has currently grown to be the largest city in Prince George's County, with more than 50,000 people. It also has a large Caucasian population, compared to much of the county (48% of the population). Housing styles vary from the most contemporary to century-old homes in Bowie's antique district (formerly known as Huntingtown), where the town of Bowie began as a haven for thoroughbred horse racing. Areas of geographic distinction include the Oden Bowie Mansion, Allen Pond, key segments of the Washington, Baltimore and Annapolis Trail, as well as planned parks, lakes and walking trails.

Rural Tier
Prince George's rural tier was designated "in the 2002 General Plan as an area where residential growth would be minimal"; it may be found in the area well beyond the Beltway to the east and south of central county, bounded on the north by U.S. Route 50, the west by the communities Accokeek and Fort Washington, and the east by the Patuxent River. Prince George's origins are in this part of the county. Most of this area contains the unincorporated parishes, villages and lost towns of Prince George's County. Largely under postal designations of "Upper Marlboro" or "Brandywine", in truth the town of Upper Marlboro is more central county in character, though it is the post office location for various rural settlements. (The names of these unincorporated areas are listed below in the towns section of this article). Since 1721 Upper Marlboro has been the county seat of government, with families that trace their lineage back to Prince George's initial land grants and earliest governing officials. Names like Clagett, Sasscer, King James and Queen Anne pepper the streets.

The rural tier has been the focus of orchestrated efforts by residents and county government to preserve its rural character and environmental integrity. Under the Maryland-National Capital Park and Planning Commission (M-NCPPC), Patuxent River Park is the largest natural preserve and provides public access for birdwatching and viewing the rural tier's natural waterfront vistas. In season, the park's Jug Bay Natural Area and the Patuxent Riverkeeper in Queen Anne both offer canoeing and kayaking rentals on the Patuxent. The county's largest collection of tobacco planter mansions and preserved homes are in the rural tier, some managed by the M-NCPPC. Many rural tier roads have scenic highway preservation status; a fall drive yields exceptional beauty along the Patuxent valley's Leeland Road, Croom Road, Clagett's Landing Rd., Mill Branch Rd., Queen Anne Rd., and Brandywine Rd. Walking access along roads in this area is very limited, because most property along the roads remains in private ownership. However, walking is much more accessible in the widespread M-NCPPC lands and trails and state holdings in the Patuxent valley, such as Merkle Wildlife Sanctuary and Rosaryville State Park, both popular among hikers and mountain bikers.

South County
South County is a blend of the greenery of the rural tier and the new development of central county. The communities of Clinton, Oxon Hill, Temple Hills and Fort Washington are the largest areas of south county. It is the only portion of Prince George's County to enjoy the Potomac River waterfront, and that geographic distinction has yielded the rise of the National Harbor project: a town center and riverside shopping and living development on the Potomac. The National Harbor, and its associated entertainment (MGM National Harbor) and shopping (Tanger Outlets) districts, have become a major tourist and convention attraction, with significant hotel accommodations, eateries and shopping. Together, these projects were built on land formerly occupied by the Salubria plantation, where a 14-year-old slave girl poisoned her owner, John H. Bayne, and his family in 1831. Water taxi service connects National Harbor to other destinations along the Potomac. Several historic sites, including Jones Point Lighthouse, can be viewed from the harbor front. Piscataway Park in Accokeek preserves many acres of woodland and wetlands along the Potomac River opposite Mount Vernon, Virginia. River Road in Fort Washington also yields great views of the Potomac. Fort Washington Park was a major battery and gives access to the public for tours of the fort, scenic access to the river and other picnic grounds. Oxon Hill Manor offers a working farm and plantation mansion for touring; His Lordship's Kindness is another major historic home. Also, Fort Foote is an old American Civil War fort and tourist destination.

Adjacent counties and independent cities
Anne Arundel County (east)
Calvert County (southeast)
Charles County (south)
Howard County (north)
Montgomery County (northwest)
Fairfax County, Virginia (southwest)
Alexandria, Virginia (southwest)
Washington, D.C. (west)

Prince George's and Montgomery Counties share a bi-county planning and parks agency in the M-NCPPC and a public bi-county water and sewer utility in the Washington Suburban Sanitary Commission

National protected areas
Fort Washington Park
Greenbelt Park
Patuxent Wildlife Research Refuge (part)
Piscataway Park
Cedarville State Forest (whose main entrance is in Prince George's county)

Politics and government
Since 1792, the county seat has been Upper Marlboro. Prior to 1792, the county seat was located at Mount Calvert, a 76-acre (308,000 m2) estate along the Patuxent River on the edge of what is now in the unincorporated community of Croom. Since 1991, the county has slowly moved government functions from rural Upper Marlboro to the Largo area, closer to the center of population, while proposals to move the actual county seat remain controversial.

Prince George's County was granted a charter form of government in 1970 with the county executive elected as the head of the executive branch and the county council members as the leadership of the legislative branch. The county is divided into nine councilmanic districts, whose number designations wind roughly from north to south. Two at-large council seats were added in 2018. Prince George's County is part of the Seventh Judicial Circuit of the state of Maryland and holds 23 of the 32 total circuit court judges in the circuit (which includes Calvert, Charles, Prince George's, and St. Mary's counties).

Fitch Ratings assigned a 'AAA' bond rating to Prince George's County on August 25, 2011, re-affirming the county's stable financial outlook. Earlier in 2011, the county received 'AAA' status from Standard & Poor's and Moody's. 'AAA' bond ratings are the highest possible bond ratings a jurisdiction can receive.

As part of the increasingly liberal D.C. suburbs and a nationwide suburban shift towards the Democrats, Prince George's County is a Democratic stronghold, having voted majority-Democratic in every presidential election but four since 1932: Dwight D. Eisenhower's landslide elections in 1952 and 1956, and Richard Nixon's two candidacies in 1968 and 1972. It has not even given over 10% of the vote to the Republican nominee since 2008, and was Joe Biden's second strongest county in the country (and third-best county equivalent after Washington, D.C.) in the 2020 presidential election, only behind Kalawao County, Hawaii, awarding him 89.26% of the vote. 

|}

County executive and council

Other officials
State's Attorney: Aisha N. Braveboy (D)
County Sheriff: Melvin C. High (D)
County Fire Chief: Tiffany D. Green
Clerk of the Circuit Court: Mahasin El Amin
Chief of the County Police: Malik Aziz
PGCPS Chief Executive Officer: Monica Goldson

Emergency services

Law enforcement

Prince George's County is serviced by multiple law enforcement agencies. The Prince George's County Police Department is the primary police service for county residents residing in unincorporated areas of the county. In addition, the Prince George's County Sheriff's Office acts as the enforcement arm of the county court, and also shares some patrol responsibility with the county police. County parks are serviced by the Prince George's County Division of the Maryland-National Capital Park Police.
Besides the county-level services, all but one of the 27 local municipalities maintain police departments that share jurisdiction with the county police services. Furthermore, the Maryland State Police enforces the law on state highways which pass through the county with the exception of Maryland Route 200 where the Maryland Transportation Authority Police is the primary law enforcement agency and the Maryland Department of Natural Resources Police patrol the state parks and navigable waterways located within the county.

Along with the state and local law enforcement agencies, the federal government also maintains several departments that service citizens of the county such as the US Park Police, US Postal Police, the 316th Security Forces Squadron (specifically covering Andrews AFB), and other federal police located on various federal property within the county.

In addition, nearly all of the incorporated cities and towns in the county have their own municipal police force. Notable exceptions include the city of College Park.

Other emergency services
Prince George's County hospitals include Bowie Health Center, Doctors Community Hospital in Lanham, Gladys Spellman Specialty Hospital & Nursing Center in Cheverly, Laurel Regional Hospital in Laurel, Southern Maryland Hospital Center in Clinton, University of Maryland Capital Region Medical Center, a state-of-the-art acute care teaching hospital, and Fort Washington Medical Center. Hospice of the Chesapeake has offices in Largo, with a staff that serves patients in their homes, including skilled nursing, senior living and assisted living facilities.

The Prince George's County Volunteer Firemen's Association was formed in 1922 with several of the first companies organized in the county. The first members of the association were Hyattsville, Cottage City, Mount Rainier, and Brentwood.

In March 1966, the Prince George's County Government employed the firefighters who had been hired by individual volunteer stations and an organized career department was begun. The career firefighters and paramedics are represented by IAFF 1619. Prince George's County Fire/Rescue Operations consists of 45 Fire/EMS stations.

Prince George's County became the first jurisdiction in Maryland to implement the 9-1-1 Emergency Reporting System in 1973. Advanced life support services began for citizens of the county in 1977. Firefighters were certified as Cardiac Rescue Technicians and deployed in what was called at the time Mobile Intensive Care Units to fire stations in Brentwood, Silver Hill, and Laurel.

As of 2007, the Prince George's County Fire/EMS Department operates a combination system staffed by over 800 career firefighters and paramedics, and nearly 1,100 active volunteers.

County law has, for years, required  to seize all pitbulls from their owners if they become aware of them. This is controversial and Animal Control itself objects to this law. It has routinely required them to act when they see such a dog behaving peacefully inside of a private home merely because Animal Control is checking something unrelated.

Transportation

The County contains a 28-mile portion of the 65-mile-long Capital Beltway. After a decades-long debate, an east–west toll freeway, the Intercounty Connector ("ICC"), which extends Interstate 370 in Montgomery County to connect I-270 with Interstate 95 and U.S. 1 in Laurel, opened in 2012. An 11.5-mile portion of the 32.5-mile-long Baltimore–Washington Parkway runs from the county's border with Washington, D.C., to its border with Anne Arundel County near Laurel.

The Washington Metropolitan Area Transit Authority operates Metrobus fixed-route bus service and Metrorail heavy-rail passenger service in and out of the county as well as the regional MetroAccess paratransit system for the handicapped. The Prince George's County Department of Public Works and Transportation also operates TheBus, a County-wide fixed-route bus system, and the Call-A-Bus service for passengers who do not have access to or have difficulty using fixed-route bus service. Call-A-Bus is a demand-response service which generally requires 14-days advance reservations. The county also offers a subsidized taxicab service for elderly and disabled residents called Call-A-Cab in which eligible customers who sign up for the service purchase coupons giving them a 50 percent discount with participating taxicab companies in Prince George's and Montgomery Counties.

Mass transit

Prince George's County Metro Rail 
Washington Metropolitan Area Transit Authority has fifteen stations of the Washington Metro system located in Prince George's County, with four of them as terminus stations: Greenbelt, New Carrollton, Largo, and Branch Avenue. The Purple Line, which would link highly developed areas of both Montgomery and Prince George's Counties is currently under-construction and slated to open in 2022. The Purple Line will provide connections to the Washington Metropolitan Area Transit Authority's Red Line (Washington Metro) via Northern Prince George's County and Montgomery County. The Orange Line (Washington Metro) and MARC Train's Penn Line will have transfer points at New Carrollton station.

Prince George's County Commuter Rail
The MARC Train (Maryland Area Rail Commuter) train service has two lines that traverse Prince George's County. The Camden Line, which runs between Baltimore Camden Station and Washington Union Station and has six stops in the county at Riverdale, College Park, Greenbelt, Muirkirk, Laurel and Laurel Race Track. The Penn Line runs on the Amtrak route between Pennsylvania and Washington Union stations. It has three stops in the county: Bowie, Seabrook and New Carrollton.

Airports
The College Park Airport (CGS), established in 1909, is the world's oldest continuously operated airport and is home to the adjacent College Park Aviation Museum.

Privately owned general aviation airfields in the county include Freeway Airport (W00) in Mitchellville, Potomac Airfield (VKX) in Friendly, and Washington Executive Airpark/Hyde Field (W32) in Clinton, along with numerous private heliports.

The area is served by three airports: Ronald Reagan Washington National Airport (DCA) in Arlington County, Virginia, Baltimore–Washington International Thurgood Marshall Airport (BWI) in neighboring Anne Arundel County, and Dulles International Airport (IAD) in Dulles, Virginia.

Andrews Air Force Base (ADW), the airfield portion of Joint Base Andrews, is also near Camp Springs.

Water taxi
Prince George's County is served by a water taxi that operates from the National Harbor to Alexandria, Virginia and to The Wharf in Washington, D.C.

Major highways

Future transit
Because of its location north and east of Washington, D.C., several future transit technology projects look to be routed partially through Prince George's County. The first stage of The Boring Company's proposed Washington-to-New York hyperloop will travel beneath the Baltimore–Washington Parkway through Prince George's en route to Baltimore. No hyperloop stops within the county are projected. Similarly, Maryland Governor Larry Hogan has supported efforts to trial a 40-mile superconducting maglev (SCMaglev) train route connecting Washington to Baltimore. Proposed routes would run through Prince George's parallel to the Baltimore–Washington Parkway or along the Amtrak Penn Line corridor. As with the hyperloop, no SCMaglev stop is planned within Prince George's County. The Purple Line light transit rail is currently in construction in College Park and New Carrollton.

Demographics

Prince George's County is the wealthiest African American-majority county in the United States.

2020 census

Note: the US Census treats Hispanic/Latino as an ethnic category. This table excludes Latinos from the racial categories and assigns them to a separate category. Hispanics/Latinos can be of any race.

2010 census
As of the 2010 United States Census, there were 863,420 people, 304,042 households, and 203,520 families residing in the county. The racial makeup of the county was 
 64.5% black or African American
 14.9% White 
 0.5% American Indian
 14.9% Hispanic or Latino (any race)
 4.1% Asian
 0.1% Pacific islander
 8.5% from other races
 3.2% from two or more races. 
Those of Hispanic or Latino origin made up 14.9% of the population, an equal percentage to Whites of indeterminate origin. In terms of ancestry, 6.5% were Subsaharan African, and 2.0% were American.

Of the 304,042 households, 36.8% had children under the age of 18 living with them, 40.1% were married couples living together, 20.4% had a female householder with no husband present, 33.1% were non-families, and 26.1% of all households were made up of individuals. The average household size was 2.78 and the average family size was 3.31. The median age was 34.9 years.

The median income for a household in the county was $71,260 and the median income for a family was $82,580. Males had a median income of $49,471 versus $49,478 for females. The per capita income for the county was $31,215. About 5.0% of families and 7.9% of the population were below the poverty line, including 9.6% of those under age 18 and 6.7% of those age 65 or over.

2000 Census
The racial makeup of the county was as of 2000:
 62.70% Black
 27.04% White
 0.35% Native American
 7.12% Hispanic or Latino (of any race)
 3.87% Asian
 0.06% Native Hawaiian or Pacific Islander
 3.38% Some other race
 2.61% Two or more races

By the 2008 estimates there were 298,439 households, out of which 65.1% are family households and 34.9% were non-family households. 36.4% of households had children under the age of 18 living with them, 44.00% were married couples living together, 19.60% had a female householder with no husband present. 24.10% of all households were made up of individuals, and 4.90% had someone living alone who was 65 years of age or older. The average household size was 2.74 persons and the average family size was 3.25 persons.

In the county, the population was spread out, with 26.80% under the age of 18, 10.40% from 18 to 24, 33.00% from 25 to 44, 22.10% from 45 to 64, and 7.70% who were 65 years of age or older. The median age was 33 years. For every 100 females, there were 91.50 males. For every 100 females age 18 and over, there were 87.20 males.

The median income for a household in the county in 2008 was $71,696, and the median income for a family was $81,908. The 2008 mean income for a family in the county was $94,360. As of 2000, males had a median income of $38,904 versus $35,718 for females. The 2008 per capita income for the county was $23,360. About 4.70% of families and 7.40% of the population were below the poverty line, including 9.2% of those under age 18 and 7.1% of those age 65 or over. Prince George's County is the 70th most affluent county in the United States by median income for families and the most affluent county in the United States with an African-American majority. Almost 38.8% of all households in Prince George's County, earned over $100,000 in 2008.

Education
"30.1% of all residents over the age of 25 had graduated from college and obtained a bachelor's degree (17.8%) or professional degree (12.2%). 86.2% of all residents over the age of 25 were high school graduates or higher."

Religion
Prince George's County is home to more than 800 churches, including 12 megachurches, as well as a number of mosques, synagogues, and Hindu and Buddhist temples. Property belonging to religious entities makes up  of land in the county, or 1.8% of the total area of the county.

Economy

Top employers
According to the county's comprehensive annual financial report, the top private-sector employers in the county are the following. "NR" indicates not ranked in the top ten for the year given.

The top public-sector employers in the county are as follows. "NR" indicates not ranked in the top ten for the year given.

Crime

Prince George's County accounted for 20% of murders in the State of Maryland from 1985 to 2006. A twenty-year crime index trends study, performed by Prince George's County Police Department Information Resource Management, showed the county had a 23.1% increase in total crime for the years of 2000 to 2004. Between the years of 1984 to 2004, Prince George's had a 62.8% increase in total crime.

However, as of 2009, crime had generally declined in the county and the number of homicides declined from 151 in 2005 to 99 in 2009.

As of the end of 2013, the county had experienced a record drop in crime, especially record lows in violent crimes. In 2021 and 2022, violent crime experienced an upturn, increasing by 30%.

Education

Colleges and universities

The University of Maryland System headquarters are in the unincorporated area of Adelphi.

Public schools
The county's public schools are managed by the Prince George's County Public Schools system. It serves as the school district for the entire county.

Enterprises and recreation
Prince George's County is home to the United States Department of Agriculture's Henry A. Wallace Beltsville Agricultural Research Center, NASA's Goddard Space Flight Center, the United States Census Bureau, Andrews Air Force Base, the National Archives and Records Administration's College Park facility, the University of Maryland's flagship College Park campus, Six Flags America and Six Flags Hurricane Harbor, FedExField (home of the Washington Commanders), and the National Harbor, which its developers, Peterson Companies and Gaylord Entertainment Company, bill as the largest single mixed-use project and combined convention center–hotel complex on the East Coast.

Media
WPGC-FM, Morningside, MD, take their P-G-C call letters from the name Prince George's County
Prince George's Sentinel, Seabrook, MD, weekly newspaper covering the county with a circulation of 23,000 copies

Recreation

Although Prince George's County is not often credited for the Washington Commanders, the team's home stadium, FedExField, is in Landover. No other major-league professional sports teams are in the county, though Bowie hosts the Bowie Baysox, a minor league baseball team. The county is known for its very successful youth. In basketball, ESPN published an article declaring Prince George's County the new "Hoops Hot Bed" and ranked it as the number one basketball talent pool in the country. A number of basketball prospects, including Kevin Durant, Victor Oladipo, Jeff Green, Roy Hibbert and Ty Lawson, are from AAU basketball teams such as the PG Jaguars, DC Assault, and DC Blue Devils. Besides AAU, basketball has skyrocketed from local high schools such as DeMatha Catholic High School and Bishop McNamara High School, both of which have found some great success locally and nationally.

The county's basketball talent was profiled in the 2020 documentary Basketball County, produced by Kevin Durant. Durant and numerous other residents of the county who went on to success in basketball are featured in the film.

Communities
This county contains the following incorporated municipalities:

Cities

Bowie
College Park
District Heights
Glenarden
Greenbelt
Hyattsville
Laurel
Mount Rainier
New Carrollton
Seat Pleasant

Towns

Berwyn Heights
Bladensburg
Brentwood
Capitol Heights
Cheverly
Colmar Manor
Cottage City
Eagle Harbor
Edmonston
Fairmount Heights
Forest Heights
Landover Hills
Morningside
North Brentwood
Riverdale Park
University Park
Upper Marlboro (county seat)

Part of the city of Takoma Park was formerly in Prince George's County, but since 1997 the city has been entirely in Montgomery County. The part of Takoma Park that changed counties comprises two residential neighborhoods, Carole Highlands (an unincorporated portion of which is still in Prince George's County) and New Hampshire Gardens.

Census-designated places
Unincorporated areas are also considered as towns by many people and listed in many collections of towns, but they lack local government. Various organizations, such as the United States Census Bureau, the United States Postal Service, and local chambers of commerce, define the communities they wish to recognize differently, and since they are not incorporated, their boundaries have no official status outside the organizations in question. The Census Bureau recognizes the following census-designated places in the county:

Accokeek
Adelphi
Andrews AFB
Aquasco
Baden
Beltsville
Brandywine
Brock Hall
Calverton
Camp Springs
Cedarville
Chillum
Clinton
Coral Hills
Croom
East Riverdale
Fairwood
Forestville
Fort Washington
Friendly
Glassmanor
Glenn Dale
Hillandale
Hillcrest Heights
Kettering
Konterra
Lake Arbor
Landover
Langley Park
Lanham
Largo
Marlboro Meadows
Marlboro Village
Marlow Heights
Marlton
Maryland Park
Melwood
Mitchellville
National Harbor
Oxon Hill
Peppermill Village
Queen Anne
Queenland
Rosaryville
Seabrook
Silver Hill
South Laurel
Springdale
Suitland
Summerfield
Temple Hills
Walker Mill
West Laurel
Westphalia
Woodlawn
Woodmore

Unincorporated communities

Ardmore
Avondale
Carmody Hills
Carole Highlands
Cedar Heights
Chapel Oaks
Cheltenham
Collington
Danville
Green Meadows
Indian Creek Village
Kentland
Lewisdale
Meadows
Montpelier
Muirkirk
Palmer Park
Piscataway
Raljon
Rogers Heights
South Bowie
Tantallon
Tuxedo
Vansville
West Hyattsville
White Hall
Woodyard

Ghost town
Good Luck

Sister cities

 Royal Bafokeng Nation, South Africa
 Rishon LeZion, Israel
 Ziguinchor, Senegal

Notable people

Namesakes
 The , was a United States Navy Crater-class cargo ship named after the county.

See also

National Register of Historic Places listings in Prince George's County, Maryland

References

Further reading

The Dilemma of the Black Middle Class, includes analysis of the county.

External links

Detailed 1861 Map of Prince Georges County – Ghosts of DC blog
Prince George's Community Council records at the University of Maryland Libraries

 
1696 establishments in Maryland
Baltimore–Washington metropolitan area
Maryland counties
Maryland counties on the Potomac River
Washington metropolitan area
Populated places established in 1696
Majority-minority counties and independent cities in Maryland
Prince George of Denmark